State Route 618 (SR 618) is a  long east–west state highway in the southeastern quadrant of the U.S. state of Ohio. Its eastern terminus is in northern Belpre at an interchange with SR 7.

Route description
All of SR 618 runs through the southwestern portion of Washington County.  This highway is not included as a part of the National Highway System (NHS).  The NHS is a system of routes deemed to be most important for the economy, mobility and defense of the country.

History
SR 618 was applied in 1937.  The highway was originally routed along what is now SR 7 and SR 32 and, in part, US 50, from the point that marks the western terminus of SR 618 into Belpre.  Meanwhile, what is now designated as SR 618 was the routing of US 50 and SR 7 at the time.

In 1965, SR 618 and US 50/SR 7 switched alignments. SR 618 was routed onto its present alignment, while US 50 and SR 7 was moved onto the former alignment of SR 618, which was widened into a four-lane divided highway simultaneous to the alignment swap.

Major intersections

References

618
Transportation in Washington County, Ohio
U.S. Route 50